Sidney Wallace Morrison (born May 13, 1933) is an American farmer and politician who served as a member of the United States House of Representatives from January 3, 1981 until January 3, 1993. A member of the Republican Party, Morrison had previously serve in both chambers of the Washington State Legislature and later served as Secretary of the Washington State Department of Transportation under Governors Mike Lowry and Gary Locke.

Early life and education

Born in Yakima, Washington, Morrison attended public schools in Toppenish, Washington and was admitted to Yakima Valley College in 1951. In 1954, he graduated from Washington State University in Pullman with a Bachelor of Science degree. He served in the United States Army from 1954 to 1956.

Career 
After his discharge from the Army, Morrison was a partner of the family-owned fruit distribution business. From 1966 to 1974, Morrison was a member of the Washington House of Representatives, representing the 15th District. He served the 15th District in the Washington Senate from 1974 until 1980.

After his election to the 97th United States Congress in 1980, Morrison became a member of the House Energy and Agriculture Committees. He served Washington's 4th congressional district for 6 terms from 1981 to 1993. In 1992 Morrison was a candidate for governor, but he was defeated in the primary by Attorney General Ken Eikenberry. Eikenberry was subsequently defeated in the general election by Seattle Congressman Mike Lowry.

In early 1993, Morrison was appointed by Governor Mike Lowry to serve as the Secretary of the Washington State Department of Transportation. Morrison left office in 2001.

Morrison is the chair of the Mainstream Republicans of Washington, a centrist PAC. In March, 2005, was appointed to the Board of Trustees for Central Washington University.

Personal life 
As of 2007, Morrison was a resident of Zillah, Washington.

References

External links

 

1933 births
Living people
Republican Party members of the United States House of Representatives from Washington (state)
Republican Party Washington (state) state senators
Republican Party members of the Washington House of Representatives
Politicians from Yakima, Washington
People from Yakima County, Washington
Military personnel from Washington (state)
State cabinet secretaries of Washington (state)